The Knox School may refer to:

The Knox School (Australia), Melbourne, Victoria
The Knox School (United States), Saint James, New York, USA